Joseph and Potiphar's Wife may refer to a number of pictures based on the story told in Book of Genesis chapter 39:

 Joseph and Potiphar's Wife (Finoglia) - 1620-1623 (or possibly c.1640) painting by Italian artist Paolo Finoglia
 Joseph and Potiphar's Wife (Murillo) - 1640–1645 oil on canvas painting by the Spanish artist Murillo
 Joseph and Potiphar's Wife (Orazio Gentileschi) - c.1630-1632 painting by the Italian artist Orazio Gentileschi 
 Joseph and Potiphar's Wife (etching) -  1634 etching by the Dutch artist Rembrandt
 Joseph and Potiphar's Wife (Tintoretto) - painting by Tintoretto